Hoi Polloi is a 1935 short subject directed by Del Lord starring American slapstick comedy team The Three Stooges (Moe Howard, Larry Fine and Curly Howard). It is the tenth entry in the series released by Columbia Pictures starring the comedians, who released 190 shorts for the studio between 1934 and 1959.

Plot
In an adaptation of the 1913 play Pygmalion by George Bernard Shaw, Professor Richmond (Harry Holman), certain that environment and not heredity dictates social behavior, bets one of his peers, Professor Nichols (Robert Graves) $10,000 that he can take a common man and through environment and proper training turn him into a gentleman. Professor Richmond responds that there are always one or two exceptions to every rule, but agrees on a wager for Professor Nichols to train three common people to become gentlemen. Naturally, the Stooges, who are garbage men, are discovered and made the subjects of the wager. After many attempts to teach them proper etiquette (including a dance class punctuated by an errant bee that flies down the back of their female dance instructor), the Stooges will decide the wager by their behavior at a fancy society party given by Richmond.

The party does not go well: Curly pulls Moe's jacket threads until it splits. Moe then hijacks Curly's oversized jacket. Larry and Moe dance with stomped feet and bumps galore. Curly, as usual, gets most of the faux pas: he shaves in front of a guest; he gets stuck on a spittoon; he picks a  "mascasino" (maraschino) cherry from a punch bowl; he hides a bottle of champagne, which Moe sees. Frustrated, Moe kicks Curly in the pants, resulting in the champagne popping open and spraying a guest. Also, Curly has stolen silverware that he has hidden under his clothing.  When Moe hits him, the silverware drops onto the floor.

Eventually, Professor Richmond admits he's lost the bet and gives a check to Professor Nichols. Nichols in turn apologizes to Mrs. Richmond for annoying her with the "rowdies". The remark does not go over well with her, and she says "Spread out!" and then slaps him in the face, apparently having picked up the Stooges' behavior. Professor Richmond laughs, and Mrs. Richmond slaps him. In quick succession, the guests begin imitating the Stooges and laugh at each other's misfortunes. Slaps and gouges fly until the party becomes a melee of Stooge-born slapstick. The Stooges, disgusted by it all, realize that this is what they get for "associating with the hoi polloi" and decide to leave, but Richmond and Nichols get the last laugh on them via champagne bottles crashed onto their heads.

Production notes
The idea for Hoi Polloi came from Moe Howard's wife, Helen, who was offered either screen credit or money (she took the latter). Moe later stated that the plot of Hoi Polloi was so good that it bore repeating. The Stooges reworked the film twice more, as Half-Wits Holiday in 1947 (Curly's final starring role) and Pies and Guys in 1958. Filming for Hoi Polloi was completed May 2–6, 1935.

In the first street scene where the Stooges are rubbish sanitation workers, the original "Hollywoodland" sign is visible in the distance. On the street is a marquee advertising the film Mississippi featuring Bing Crosby. Coincidentally, this film also co-stars Fred Kohler who portrayed Double Deal Decker in the short Horses' Collars released the same year.

In the Three Stooges 75th Anniversary Special, hosted by Woody Harrelson, the dancing scene with Geneva Mitchell was voted by the fans as their favorite Stooge moment of all time. The dancing sequence footage would be reused in 1941's In the Sweet Pie and Pie.

This is the first of three shorts in which Curly gets a sofa spring attached to his back. The spring gag would be used again in Three Little Sew and Sews, An Ache in Every Stake, with Shemp Howard in Hugs and Mugs and Curly-Joe DeRita in Have Rocket, Will Travel.

During the dance sequence, Larry loses his shoe. At one point actress Phyllis Crane, dancing with Moe, trips on the shoe and falls down, visibly striking her head on the floor; this was not scripted.

A colorized version of this film was released in 2006. It was not released on a Stooge DVD, but rather as a hastily added DVD bonus feature for the Jamie Foxx movie Breakin' All the Rules.

References

External links
 
Hoi Polloi at threestooges.net
Hoi Polloi at threestoogespictures.info

1935 films
1935 comedy films
American black-and-white films
Films based on works by George Bernard Shaw
Films directed by Del Lord
The Three Stooges films
Columbia Pictures short films
American slapstick comedy films
1930s English-language films
1930s American films